Yuriy Dyachuk-Stavytskyi (26 January 1947 – 24 June 2020) was a Ukrainian football manager.

Career
He coached following teams FC Bukovyna Chernivtsi, FC Prykarpattya Ivano-Frankivsk, FC Volyn Lutsk, FC Hazovyk Komarne (today's FC Lviv), FC Anzhi Makhachkala, and FC Metalurh Zaporizhia. Honorary coach of Ukraine of 1999.

He died on 24 June 2020.

Personal life
His son Mykhaylo is also a Ukrainian retired footballer and current manager.

References

External links
Official biography from FC Karpaty website

1947 births
2020 deaths
Sportspeople from Lviv
Lviv State University of Physical Culture alumni
Association football goalkeepers
Soviet footballers
NK Veres Rivne players
Soviet football managers
Ukrainian football managers
FC Spartak Ivano-Frankivsk managers
FC Hazovyk Komarno managers
FC Volyn Lutsk managers
FC Karpaty Lviv managers
Ukrainian Premier League managers